Robert David Simari (born June 6, 1960) is an American educator, medical doctor, and 10th executive vice chancellor of the University of Kansas Medical Center. Prior to becoming the executive vice chancellor, he was the executive dean University of Kansas School of Medicine, a position he held from 2014 to 2019. Prior to returning to his alma mater, Simari served as a professor in cardiology among other roles, at the Mayo Clinic College of Medicine and Science.

Biography

Early years 
Simari moved to Overland Park, Kansas at the age of 10 and graduated from Shawnee Mission West High School. He received his Bachelor of Science from the University of Notre Dame and completed his doctorate from the KU School of Medicine. His residency was at the Beth Israel Deaconess Medical Center and ending with a fellowship at the Mayo Clinic. For a few years, he completed research at the University of Michigan before returning to the Mayo Clinic.

University of Kansas Medical Center 
In March 2014, Simari was named the executive dean for KU's school of medicine. During his time as executive dean, Simari helped create a new curriculum for the school and oversaw the construction of a new education building. In June 2017, Simari was named interim executive vice chancellor for KU Medical Center, and was promoted to the permanent position on January 9, 2018. He continued serving as the school of medicine‘s executive Dean until August 2019 when he hired his successor.

During his time as executive vice chancellor, Simari has focused on diversity, equity, and inclusion by creating a new department in 2019. Simari continues to practice cardiology at the University of Kansas Health System.

References

External links 
 Executive Vice Chancellor profile

University of Notre Dame alumni
University of Kansas School of Medicine alumni
University of Kansas faculty
1960 births
Living people
American cardiologists
Educators from Kansas
Leaders of the University of Kansas Medical Center